Wayne Township is one of the sixteen townships of Belmont County, Ohio, United States. The 2010 census found 709 people in the township.

Geography
Located in the southern part of the county, it borders the following townships:
Goshen Township - north
Smith Township - northeast
Washington Township - east
Sunsbury Township, Monroe County - southeast
Malaga Township, Monroe County - southwest
Somerset Township - west
Warren Township - northwest corner

Part of the village of Wilson is located in southern Wayne Township.

Name and history
Named for Anthony Wayne, it is one of twenty Wayne Townships statewide.

In 1833, several gristmills and saw mills were operating in Wayne Township, powered by the waters of Captina Creek.

Government
The township is governed by a three-member board of trustees, who are elected in November of odd-numbered years to a four-year term beginning on the following January 1. Two are elected in the year after the presidential election and one is elected in the year before it. There is also an elected township fiscal officer, who serves a four-year term beginning on April 1 of the year after the election, which is held in November of the year before the presidential election. Vacancies in the fiscal officership or on the board of trustees are filled by the remaining trustees.

References

External links
County website

Townships in Belmont County, Ohio
Townships in Ohio